The 1981–82 Nationalliga A season was the 44th season of the Nationalliga A, the top level of ice hockey in Switzerland. Eight teams participated in the league, and EHC Arosa won the championship.

First round

Qualification for final round 
 SC Bern - EHC Biel 2:3

Final round

Relegation

External links
 Championnat de Suisse 1981/82

Swiss
National League (ice hockey) seasons
1981–82 in Swiss ice hockey